The 2018 Zambia Super League, known as the MTN/FAZ Super Division for sponsorship purposes, was the 57th season of the top-tier association football league in Zambia which ran from 17 March to 28 October 2018. ZESCO United claimed their 7th league title and thus retained it having won it the previous season.

Standings

Top scorers 

Source: FIFA.com

References

External links
2018 League summary (currently active) and its archive (just in case) via Bari91.com
2018 League summary via RSSSF

Zambia Super League
2018 in Zambian sport
2018 in African association football leagues